ARY Film Award for Best Star Debut Female is one of the ARY Film Awards of Merit presented annually by the ARY Digital Network and Entertainment Channel to recognize the female actor who has delivered an outstanding debut performance while working in the film industry. Since its inception, the award is commonly called the AFA for Best Star Debut Female. Actors are nominated for this award by actor and actress AFA members; winners are selected by the AFA membership as a whole.

History
The Best Star Debut Female category originates with the 1st ARY Film Awards ceremony since 2014. The Best Star Debut Female is awarded by viewers voting and known as Best Star Debut Female Viewers Choice but officially it is termed as Best Star Debut Female. Since ARY Film Awards has been just started, this category has not a brief history.

Winners and nominees
As of the first ceremony, total of five actors were nominated. This category is among fourteen Viewers Awards in ARY Film Awards. 
Date and the award ceremony shows that the 2010 is the period from 2010-2020 (10 years-decade), while the year above winners and nominees shows that the film year in which they were releases, and the figure in bracket shows the ceremony number, for example; an award ceremony is held for the films of its previous year.

2010s

References

External links

 ARY Film Awards Official website

ARY Film Award winners
ARY Film Awards
Film awards for debut actress